Richard Colvin Cox (born 25 July 1928, last seen 14 January 1950) was an American second-year cadet who disappeared from the United States Military Academy at West Point, New York. In January 1950, he was visited by a man whose first name may have been George three times over the course of a week. On the third occasion, Cox and "George" left the grounds of the academy and were never seen again. According to an eyewitness account from another cadet, the two men seemed to have known each other somewhere other than West Point. Cox is the only West Point cadet to have disappeared without a trace.

Early life
Richard C. Cox was born in Mansfield, Ohio on July 25, 1928, the youngest of six children born to Rupert F. and Minnie Colvin Cox. His father died when Richard was ten, as the result of a diabetic condition that had gone untreated because the Cox family were practicing Christian Scientists. Richard's mother owned and operated the family business, the Rupert F. Cox Insurance Agency.

Cox attended the public schools of Mansfield and graduated from Mansfield Senior High School in 1946. During his high school years, Cox told a friend he did not have time to participate on athletic teams because he always had an after-school job. During summer vacations in his teen years, he worked full-time. While working on a road crew in Mansfield, he fell and cut his arm on a scythe. Cox immediately went home for help from his mother, who refused to obtain medical aid because she was a Christian Science lay reader. The injury became infected and a neighbor brought Cox to a doctor. Cox's cut healed, but Cox had a prominent scar.

Military career
After high school, Cox volunteered for the United States Army. He joined the United States Constabulary, which carried out police occupation and security duties in Allied-occupied Germany, and attained the rank of sergeant. In May 1947, he began an assignment with Troop C, 6th Constabulary Squadron, based in Coburg in the American occupation zone of Germany. He was later assigned to the 6th Squadron's Headquarters Company, where he worked in the S-2 (intelligence) section. When the 6th Squadron was disbanded, Cox was assigned to Troop D, 27th Constabulary Squadron in Schweinfurt.

Later in 1947, Cox received an appointment to West Point, and he arrived at the United States Military Academy Preparatory School (then located at Stewart Field) in January 1948. His prep school classmates included Ernest Shotwell, who later became an important source on Cox's disappearance when he provided an eyewitness account that indicated Cox had disappeared voluntarily and was deliberately avoiding contact with his family.

Cox entered West Point in May 1948 and performed well; academically, he was ranked about 100th of 550. Cox was engaged to be married; he and his fiancée, Betty Timmons, planned to marry after his graduation from West Point.

Disappearance
At 4:45 pm on Saturday, 7 January 1950, a man telephoned Cox's West Point classmate, Peter Hains, who was acting as Charge of Quarters in Cadet Company B-2 (part of the North Barracks) and answered incoming calls for company members. He later said the caller's "tone was rough and patronizing, almost insulting." After Hains told the man that Cox was not in his room, the man replied, "Well, look, when he comes in, tell him to come on down here to the hotel. ... Just tell him George called – he'll know who I am. We knew each other in Germany. I'm just up here for a little while, and tell him I'd like to get him a bite to eat." Hains later stated he could not be completely certain the name given was "George", as he had answered many phone calls while on duty and that one had not seemed noteworthy at the time; Cox never referred to the man by name.

At 5:30 pm, a man entered Grant Hall - an area where cadets could meet guests—and asked to see Cox. The cadet on duty telephoned Cox to tell him he had a visitor. He was fair-haired, had a fair complexion and wore a belted trenchcoat, but no hat. When Cox entered the Hall, he shook hands with the man; the cadet on duty later recalled he seemed glad to see him. Cox signed out in the Company B-2 Departure Book, indicating he would have dinner off-campus. Cox later admitted to his roommates that they did not dine, but drank from a bottle of whiskey while sitting inside the man's parked car.

Cox returned to Cadet Company B-2, signed the Departure Book, took a shower, and slept off the effects of the alcohol. As a prank, his roommates photographed him, slumped over his desk, asleep. Later that evening, Cox altered the military time he had written in the Departure Book, changing "1923" to "1823" to make it look as if he had attended the 6:30 pm cadet supper formation. In fact, he had skipped the formation. This detail was not discovered until two years later, when an agent of the U.S. Army Criminal Investigation Command had the Departure Book examined in a laboratory. If the alteration had been discovered when it was fresh in January 1950, Cox could have been charged with violating the Cadet Honor Code.

The next morning, before attending the Sunday chapel service, Cox mentioned his visitor to his roommates. The man, Cox said, was a former US Army Ranger who had served in the same unit as he had in Germany. Cox said the man liked to brag about killing Germans during the war and had boasted about cutting off their private parts afterward. Another story he told Cox was about having gotten a German girl pregnant, and then murdering her to prevent her from having the baby. That afternoon, Cox signed out a second time to meet the man, returning at about 4:30 pm. The following six days were without incident. Cox mentioned his visitor once to his roommates, remarking that he "hoped he wouldn't have to see the fellow again," which gave them the impression he viewed the man with distaste.

On Saturday, 14 January, Cox watched a basketball game between the Army and Rutgers University. Afterwards, he was seen talking to a man thought to be "George," although the cadet who saw the two talking gave a description that differed greatly from the description given by the cadet who had seen the stranger in Grant Hall on 7 January. According to the eyewitness description from 14 January, George was "dark-haired and rough looking." Cox returned to his room and mentioned to a roommate he was signing out to dine with his visitor again, although he appeared "not apprehensive, just sort of disgusted." The two men left the grounds of the academy and vanished without a trace.

Official investigation
Cox was supposed to return by 11 pm, but when he did not appear, no alarm was raised because cadets occasionally returned late. His continued absence was reported to a superior officer at 2:30 am, but again no action was taken as cadets had been known to stay out all night despite the punishment this would incur. On Sunday morning, his roommates reported all they knew of the matter to their superior; the New York State Police and the CID were informed. The FBI also became involved in the investigation.

Three days after Cox's disappearance, a public appeal for information was broadcast on nearby radio stations. The grounds of West Point were intensively searched by helicopter and by troops on the ground. The Lusk Reservoir was dragged, the banks of the Hudson River were searched and a nearby pond was drained. The manhunt lasted two months but produced no significant leads. A search of Army records for a soldier who had served with Cox and matched the description of "George", led almost without exception to individuals who could not have been at West Point at the time of the disappearance. Cox's service in Germany was investigated and revealed nothing out of the ordinary. The theory that he had deliberately deserted from West Point was discounted, as he had left behind in his room $87 (about $ in 2021) and two suits of civilian clothes. On 15 March 1950, Cox was listed as absent without leave.

Based on a West Point psychologist's speculation (without evidence) that two single men meeting several times were probably "homosexualist," the FBI looked into the possibility that Cox was gay or bisexual. This inquiry included visiting gay bars in New York City with Cox's roommates to see if they could identify anyone as "George" or if any patrons reported knowing Cox. The roommates never saw anyone who fit the description of George, no one provided reliable information about having seen Cox, and Cox's friends and family discounted the questions about his sexual orientation.

In 1954, Shotwell, who had joined the U.S. Coast Guard after leaving the West Point prep school, reported to the FBI that he had had a conversation with Cox at the Washington, D.C. Greyhound Lines bus station in 1952, two years after Cox's disappearance. Shotwell knew that Cox had been absent from West Point, but when he saw Cox at the bus station, he assumed that Cox was no longer missing. During their encounter at the bus station, Shotwell said Cox claimed to have resigned from West Point, and said he was moving to Germany. According to Shotwell, Cox also seemed uncomfortable, was vague about his plans, and left after only five minutes.

Though the FBI considered the investigation closed, with all leads exhausted and a solution unlikely, Cox's family had him declared legally dead in 1957. Despite the FBI's position that there were no further leads to pursue, it still followed up on occasional tips. One of these was a reported sighting of Cox in 1960, when an FBI informant claimed to have spent time at a bar in Melbourne, Florida with a man he later identified as Cox. The man called himself R. C. Mansfield and his acquaintances called him "Richard." The informant went on to claim that "Mansfield" stated that Fidel Castro's time as Cuba's leader would be "limited." Subsequent investigation failed to uncover further details on "Mansfield."

Jacobs investigation 
Harry Maihafer's book Oblivion (1996) documents the investigation of retired high school history teacher Marshall Jacobs into Cox's disappearance. Jacobs began his research in 1985, and considered it inconceivable that after 35 years the mystery had not been solved. During the ten years between Jacobs beginning his investigation and Maihafer writing the book, A Current Affair broadcast a segment about the Cox mystery. The piece was anchored by Krista Bradford, who was seen interviewing Marshall Jacobs and Ernest Shotwell. 

For ten years, Jacobs thoroughly investigated the case, traveling across the United States following up on new leads and revisiting old leads.  He interviewed Cox's family, high school friends, military pals, and West Point classmates; CIA, FBI, and CID agents; and West Point and Army officials. He researched West Point's archives and the files from the FBI, CIA, and CID investigations of Cox's disappearance, to which he gained access under the Freedom of Information Act. Among Jacobs' findings was that authorities had been remiss when they discounted the theory that Cox had disappeared deliberately. Jacobs came to believe that the presence of 87 dollars in Cox's shared room did not rule out the possibility that his visitor had helped him start a new career with a new identity.

The old leads Jacobs revisited included ones from Mansfield News Journal reporter Jim Underwood, who had written a 12-installment series on the Cox mystery that the News Journal published in 1982. Underwood had interviewed a high school acquaintance of Cox named Ralph E. Johns, an army veteran and prosecutor who later served as a judge in Mansfield.

Johns told Underwood that he had not been involved in the original investigation in the 1950s, but that he and county prosecutor William McKee were interested in the Cox case and had frequent contacts with local FBI officials. Johns also told Underwood that when he discussed Cox with former FBI agent Vince Napoli, Napoli said the FBI had once been within twenty-four hours of grabbing Cox, and could not understand why agency superiors would not let agents pick him up. Johns speculated, perhaps based on Napoli's story, that Cox might have gone into some secret government agency such as the CIA. In the late 1980s, Jacobs interviewed Johns, who confirmed that he had raised the possibility of a secret government agency's involvement, but said it was only his speculation.

When he was ready to reveal his findings, Jacobs contacted Maihafer with hopes they could collaborate on a book. The resulting work, Oblivion, contains a photo section including the snapshot that Cox's roommates took of him on 7 January 1950 as he slept off the effects of the alcohol he had consumed in his visitor's parked car a short time earlier.

Questions and concerns
As detailed by Maihafer, Jacobs was left with several questions and unresolved issues, some of which were contradictory. Among these were:

1. The fact that Cox left money, civilian clothes, and a prized gold watch in his room indicated he did not plan to leave permanently.

2. A letter to Betty that he never finished included a hand drawn face spitting on the words "United States Military Academy." This draft letter also contained passages that suggested Cox was considering leaving West Point because he was unhappy with the regimen.

3. Several of Cox's friends and acquaintances said he told them he had testified at a court-martial while in Germany or had provided civilian court testimony against an individual charged with murder. Though neither the FBI nor Jacobs had uncovered any evidence of such a proceeding, the fact that Cox told so many people about it raised the possibility that "George" might have been someone seeking revenge against Cox.

4. Soon after Cox disappeared, a letter he sent to Rosemary Vogel, a woman he had met in Germany, which included inquiries about Russian activities in Germany, was returned as undeliverable. She was later located in the United States, where she had moved after marrying an American. She recalled Cox's friend Joseph "Bud" Groner, but did not remember meeting Cox until shown a photo of herself with Groner and Cox. She indicated that she did not know why Cox would have written to her, but Cox's queries about Russian activity raised the possibility that he was involved in intelligence gathering or wanted to be.

5. John H. Noble, an American living in Germany, was seized by the Russians in 1945 and imprisoned until 1955. Noble reported that the Soviet Union was holding a prisoner named  “Cox” at a camp in Vorkuta, Siberia. The identity of this individual could not be confirmed, but it raised the possibility that Cox could have become involved in espionage or black market activities while serving in Germany.

6. The FBI informant who claimed to have met "R .C. Mansfield" (Mansfield being Cox’s hometown) provided enough detail for this to have been a credible sighting. In addition, "Mansfield's" anti-Castro remarks less than a year before the Bay of Pigs Invasion again raised the possibility that Cox was involved in clandestine intelligence work.

7. Robert W. Frisbee, who had been stationed at Fort Knox at the same time as Cox and who seemed to fit the description of "George," was known to have traded in false IDs in New York City the 1950s, something Cox might need if he had disappeared intentionally. Frisbee was arrested for the 1985 murder of socialite Muriel Barnett aboard a cruise ship and imprisoned in Canada, but disclaimed any knowledge of or involvement with Cox.

Possible conclusion
Although Jacobs did not definitively solve Cox's disappearance, he did develop what he considered to be a plausible explanation. Jacobs concluded that David M. Westervelt, a soldier with whom Cox served in Germany, and who was a resident of northern New Jersey, was "George." Westervelt fit the physical description and had a dubious career that caused police to interview him several times about Cox's disappearance. Jacobs suspected that Westervelt was a recruiter for the CIA, a possibility that Westervelt's family did not discount. Jacobs believed that Cox admitted unhappiness with West Point during "George's" (Westervelt's) first visit, and that during the subsequent visits Westervelt offered Cox a way out by helping him start a new life under a different name and a career with the CIA or another intelligence agency.

According to an account provided to Jacobs in the mid-1990s by a retired CIA official he did not name, Cox became part of a "stay-behind" team in Europe and spent his career smuggling Russian nuclear scientists and other high-priority individuals out of the Soviet Union and other Eastern Bloc countries. This official further stated that Cox had retired to northern Idaho, but that at the time of the official's interview with Jacobs, Cox was hospitalized with a fatal illness at the National Institutes of Health facility in Bethesda, Maryland.

Underwood series

Notes

See also
List of people who disappeared

References

External links

1950s missing person cases
1950 in military history
1950 in New York (state)
January 1950 events in the United States
People declared dead in absentia
Missing person cases in New York (state)
People from Mansfield, Ohio
United States Military Academy alumni
Military personnel from Ohio